Ludwig Huber may refer to:
 Ludwig Huber (biologist) (born 1964), professor and cognitive biologist at the University of Vienna
 Ludwig Ferdinand Huber (1764–1804), German author